Gheorghe Tătaru (5 May 1948 – 19 December 2004), also known as Tătaru II, was a Romanian football striker. He played seven years at Steaua București. He was the younger brother of Nicolae Tătaru, who also played professional football at Steaua București.

Career
Tătaru joined the junior squad of Steaua București in 1959, being promoted to the first team in 1967. He played for Steaua București until 1974. In 1974, he signed for Chimia Râmnicu Vâlcea, and then he played for FC Târgovişte (1975–1980).

In 1980, he decided to retire from football, but one year later was called up by the Liga II team Autobuzul București. He retired again in 1982, but again received a call, this time from Unirea Slobozia. He finally called it a day in 1984.

In 1970–71 he was top scorer of Liga I.

He won 6 caps for Romania and scored 1 goal. In 1970, he was part of the national team which played at the 1970 World Cup, being used in all the three games played by Romania. They were his first ever caps for Romania.

Honours

Club
Steaua București
Liga I (1): 1967–68
Cupa României (3): 1968–69, 1969–70, 1970–71
CS Târgoviște
Liga II (1): 1976–77

Individual
Liga I (1): 1970–72

Notes

References

External links 
 
 
 
 
 
 
 Profile at Steauafc.com 

1948 births
2004 deaths
Romanian footballers
Liga I players
Liga II players
FC Steaua București players
AFC Unirea Slobozia players
AFC Rocar București players
1970 FIFA World Cup players
Association football forwards
Olympic footballers of Romania
Romania international footballers
Footballers from Bucharest